WIPM may refer to:

Windward Islands People's Movement, a political party in the Caribbean Netherlands
WIPM-TV, a public television station in Mayagüez, Puerto Rico